Climate change in Morocco is expected to significantly impact Morocco on multiple dimensions, just like for other countries in the MENA region. 

As a coastal country with hot and arid climates, environmental impacts from climate change are likely to be wide and varied. Analysis of these environmental changes on the economy of Morocco are expected to create challenges at all levels of the economy. The main effects will be felt in the agricultural systems and fisheries which employ half of the population, and account for 14% of GDP. In addition, because 60% of the population and most of the industrial activity are on the coast, sea level rise is a major threat to key economic forces. As of the 2019 Climate Change Performance Index, Morocco was ranked second in preparedness behind Sweden.

Impacts on the natural environment

Temperature and weather changes

Sea level rise 
60% of the population of Morocco lives on the coast, and flooding and sea level rise are expected to significantly effect these populations. These effects are especially going to effect  economic activities, including tourism, agriculture, and industry.

According to the NOAA 2022 sea-level rise technical report, “Sea level rise will create a profound shift in coastal flooding over the next 30 years by causing tide and storm surge heights to increase and reach further inland.” The increase in sea-level rise will affect places such as the low terrain surrounding the Moulouya delta, a vital wetland on the eastern coast of Morocco, that is especially vulnerable to sea-level rise and the stress, flooding, erosion, and overall decimation of the area. The New York Times summarizes the 2022 IPCC climate change assessment, stating that these rising sea levels could "exceed what many nations can afford," both in the sense of destroyed land and economic ramifications.

Water resources 
Climate variability is expected to put a number of pressures on water resources in Morocco. Projections indicate 10%-20% decreases in precipitation across the country, with the most severe in the Saharan region by 2100. Additionally, climate change will reduce snowpack in the Atlas Mountains. This puts pressure on water resources, already stressed by other sources such as population expansion, urban growth, industry, and tourism. Furthermore, many coastal aquifers will increasingly become stressed because of coastal salinization.

Impacts on people

Economy

Agriculture 

The agricultural system in Morocco is especially vulnerable to climate change. Crop production is primarily (87%) from rainfed agriculture. A 2016 drought resulted in 70% decreases in crop yields, and slowed the economy.

Mitigation and adaptation

Renewable energy

Energy policy

Government policies and legislation 

Morocco ranked second in its approach to addressing climate change in the 2018 and 2019 Climate Change Performance Index. As per the 2022 CCPI, Morocco was ranked 8th amongst the 68 countries around the world with an overall score of 71.64%. 

The government of Morocco has a Plan Vert strategy in order to cope with climate change. In this plan, the government commits to producing over half of its energy by renewables by 2030, removing subsidies of fossil fuels, committing to green employment, focusing on ocean resource management and preserving aquifers.

See also 

 Climate change in the Middle East and North Africa

References 

 
Environment of Morocco
Morocco
Morocco